"Ye Nea Woho Beto Wo", popularly known as "Yentie Obiaa", is a controversial song by Ghanaian highlife musician Daddy Lumba, from his 2014 album Awosoo.

Etymology

Yentie obiaa literally means "we won't listen to anyone" in Akan. The theme of the song is one should do what he or she pleases and shouldn't listen to anyone.

Popularity

The song first became popular when President John Dramani Mahama went on a three-day tour in the Ashanti Region of Ghana. The song blurred from huge speakers mounted in a car in the President's convoy.
This song also became very popular when the President of Ghana John Dramani Mahama and the Asantehene as well as other dignitaries were seen on a video dancing to this tune at a private event hosted by the Asantehene at the Manhyia Palace after a commission of the Kumasi Airport.

Video
The video was shot at the residence of Kenpong, a business mogul who is a friend to Daddy Lumba and a former Board chairman of Asante Kotoko. He is also mentioned in the song.

References

Highlife songs
Ghanaian songs
2014 songs